Margamkali is a 2019 Indian romantic comedy film directed by Sreejith Vijayan, written by Shashankan Mayyanad.  from the story and screenplay of Shashankan Mayyanad, and produced by Listin Stephen and Alwin Antony. Starring Bibin George, Namitha Pramod, Gouri G. Kishan, Shanthi Krishna, Siddique and Hareesh Kanaran. The film has music composed by Gopi Sunder.

The story of the film follows three friends, Sachi (played by Bibin George) an only son of an affluent family, Antappan, a drunkard, and the other a lassi shop owner who is desperate for love. Sachi, had a failed affair so has taken an oath not to love or marry. The film was released on 2 August 2019.

Synopsis
Sachidanandan is the son of Ramanan Nair and Chandrika, a separated couple. His parents don't want him to work, as he is from an affluent family. After his break-up with Jessi, Sachi loses faith in love and marriage. Later, Sachi enters the life of Urmila, after she rejects the proposal of his best friend, "Tiktok" Unni. What happens next forms the crux of the story.

Cast

 Bibin George as Sachidanandan a.k.a. Sachi
 Al Sabith as Junior Sachidanandan
 Namitha Pramod as Urmila
 Durga Premjith as Junior Urmila
 Gouri G. Kishan as Jessy
 Siddique as Ramanan Nair, Sachidanandan's Father
 Shanthi Krishna as Chandrika, Sachidanandan's mother
 Hareesh Kanaran as Tik Tok Unni, Sachidanandan's best friend
 Baiju Santhosh as Antappan, Jessy's Father
 Dharmajan Bolgatty as Bilal
 Renji Panicker as Urmila's Father
 Narayanan Kutty as Security guard Chellappan
 Anu Joseph as Seetha, Urmila's Sister
 Sowmya Menon as Urmila, Unni's love interest
 Bindu Panicker as Urmila's Mother
 Dinesh Nair as Ganeshan, Seetha's Husband
 Surabhi Santosh as Hima
 Manju Vani
Lakshmi Priya as Poothiri Lilly
 Vishnu Unnikrishnan (Cameo)
 Dulquer Salmaan as Baby (Voice Cast)

Marketing and release
A theatrical trailer of the film was released by Millennium Audios on 24 July 2019.

The film was wide released on 2 August 2019.

Music

The soundtrack for Margamkali was composed by Gopi Sundar. Song released under Millennium Audios official label

References

External links
 

2019 films
2010s Malayalam-language films
Indian romantic comedy films
Films scored by Gopi Sundar
2019 romantic comedy films